Sarah Rachel Russell or Leverson or Levison, best known as Madame Rachel (c.1814 – 12 October 1880), was a British criminal and con artist in Victorian-era London during the late 19th century. She operated a prominent beauty salon from which she sold fabulous preparations, such as her magnetic rock water dew from the Sahara Desert. She personally guaranteed her clientele everlasting youth as a result of the use of these products, which would later be revealed as consisting of water and bran. She would later become well known for blackmailing many wives of London's upper class.

Life
Born to a Jewish theatrical family in London around 1814, a cousin of the musician Henry Russell, she was married to an assistant chemist in Manchester and in 1844 to Jacob Moses, who deserted her in 1846 and later drowned when the Royal Charter sank in 1859.  She lived with, and took the surname of, Philip Levison. She worked as a clothes dealer and later was briefly jailed for procurement before selling cosmetics and toilet requisites in 1860 using a pamphlet entitled Beautiful for Ever. 

Using her salon as a front, she was able to blackmail many of her wealthy and prominent members of London's social elite during the 1860s. Among her exaggerated and often fraudulent claims, she offered customers at least sixty preparations, including a personal mixture of face powder. One shade of face powder which is still in use today is called "Rachel", a light tannish colour, primarily for face-powder used in artificial light. However, it is named not after Madame Rachel but after the actress, Mademoiselle Rachel.

However, she continued her involvement in prostitution, fraud and blackmail during the 1860s and 1870s. Arrested several times during the next several years, she was put on trial for fraud in 1868.  The first trial in August was inconclusive and at a retrial in September she was convicted and sentenced to five years in prison, which she served mainly in Millbank Prison, and released in 1872.  She resumed her activities and was again tried in 1878 and sentenced by Baron Huddleston to five years' imprisonment; however, she died in Woking Prison on 12 October 1880 after serving two years. 

She is buried in Willesden Jewish Cemetery in London; her grave is hard to find, and does not have a headstone.

Family

Her daughter Helene Crossmond-Turner was an operatic soprano who overcame the scandal associated with "Madame Rachel" and sang with success in England, America and Italy, notably in the role of Aida in Verdi's  opera of the same name.  On 22 April 1888, following an argument with the producer, Augustus Harris, over a contract to appear at Covent Garden, in which she tore up the agreement and was replaced by alternative singers, she shot herself in the back of a cab at Piccadilly Circus, later dying at nearby St. George's Hospital.

References

Sources

External links
Jones, Glyn (1971). Beautiful For Ever – A Play for women London: Samuel French Ltd. 
The Extraordinary Life & Trial of Madame Rachel at the Central Criminal Court, Old Bailey, London  at The Open Library

Year of birth missing
1810s births
1880 deaths
19th-century English businesspeople
19th-century English businesswomen
19th-century English criminals
Burials at Willesden Jewish Cemetery
Criminals from London
English female criminals
English fraudsters
English Jews
English people who died in prison custody
English pimps
Jewish women in business
Prisoners who died in England and Wales detention
Women of the Victorian era
History of cosmetics